KBOZ-FM (99.9 MHz, "99.9 K-Bear") is a radio station licensed to Bozeman, Montana, United States. The station serves the Bozeman area.  The station's licensee is held by Desert Mountain Broadcasting Licenses, LLC.

The offices and all the studios are located southwest of Bozeman at "Radio Ranch", 5445 Johnson Road. KBOZ-FM shares a transmitter site with KBOZ and KOBB-FM, east of the studios on Johnson Road and Fowler Lane. KBOZ-FM, KOZB, and KOBB-FM all have construction permits to move to a new shared transmitter site on top of Green Mountain, along I-90 east of Bozeman.

History
The station was assigned the call letters KZLO on December 17, 1992; an "-FM" suffix was added on March 22, 1993. KZLO-FM signed on in April 1993 as a country music station branded as "The Fox". On May 21, 2004, the station became the current KBOZ-FM.

On June 1, 2018, KBOZ-FM and its sister stations went off the air.

Effective December 6, 2019, the licenses for KBOZ-FM and its sister stations were involuntary assigned from Reier Broadcasting Company, Inc. to Richard J. Samson, as Receiver. The licenses for these stations were sold to Desert Mountain Broadcasting Licenses, LLC in a deal completed in January 2022.

Previous Logo

References

External links

BOZ-FM
Radio stations established in 1993
1993 establishments in Montana
 Oldies radio stations in the United States